is a Japanese manga artist. He is best known as the creator of the manga series Golden Kamuy, for which he won the 2016 Manga Taishō and the 2018 Tezuka Osamu Cultural Prize.

Biography
Noda was born in Kitahiroshima, Hokkaido, Japan. His great-grandfather was a military settler in Hokkaido and veteran of the Russo-Japanese War; Noda named the protagonist of his manga series Golden Kamuy after him. After moving to Tokyo at the age of 23, he entered the manga industry as an artist assistant. Noda was an assistant to Mitsurou Kubo for two years, and later worked under .

After working as an artist assistant for nearly a decade, Noda made his serialized manga debut in 2011 with Supinamarada!, serialized in Weekly Young Jump. After Supinamarada! was a commercial failure, Noda took a year before developing his next series, 2014's Golden Kamuy. The series would become a widespread critical and commercial success, and won the Manga Taishō in 2016 and the Tezuka Osamu Cultural Prize in 2018. Following the conclusion of Golden Kamuy in 2022, Noda announced that he would relaunch  Supinamarada!.

Little is known about Noda's personal life. Though he maintains an online presence and is interviewed by the press about his work, he does not make public appearances; upon winning the Manga Taishō in 2016, the award was accepted by his editor, with Noda delivering an audio-only acceptance speech.

Style
Noda draws using digital illustration exclusively. While Noda is noted for conducting in-depth research on subject material that appears in his manga, he has stated that he is not interested in maintaining strict historical accuracy in his work, citing historically inaccurate elements in Golden Kamuy such as skiing and certain firearms that were added for dramatic effect.

Hallmarks of his work include visual references to pop culture, and narratives that juxtapose gag comedy against violent or dramatic moments. Handsome and muscular men are a recurring element of Noda's work; he has voiced his distaste for -styled manga, and has stated that he "draw[s] without compromise the beautiful bodies of men."

Works

Serials
Supinamarada!, serialized in Weekly Young Jump (2011–2012)
Golden Kamuy, serialized in Weekly Young Jump (2014–2022)

One-shots
 , published in Monthly Young Magazine (2006)
 Love of the Giant God Warrior - Spinamarada! Gaiden-( Aoharu No.0.99)
 World Wide Wild ("Weekly Young Jump, etc." Vol.23, 2013)

Awards

|-
! scope="row" | 2006
| Gōrī wa Mae Shika Mukanai
| Young Artist Division
| 
| 
| 
| 
|-
! scope="row" | 2016
| Golden Kamuy
| Male Readers
| Kono Manga ga Sugoi!
| 
| 
| 
|-
! scope="row" | 2016
| Golden Kamuy
| Grand Prize
| Tezuka Osamu Cultural Prize
| 
| 
| 
|-
! scope="row" | 2016
| Golden Kamuy
| 
| Manga Taishō
| 
| 
| 
|-
! scope="row" | 2017
| Golden Kamuy
| Grand Prize
| Tezuka Osamu Cultural Prize
| 
| 
| 
|-
! scope="row" | 2018
| Golden Kamuy
| Grand Prize
| Tezuka Osamu Cultural Prize
| 
| 
| 
|-
! scope="row" | 2018
| Golden Kamuy
| Best U.S. Edition of International Material—Asia
| Eisner Award
| 
| English-language translation by Viz Media
|

Notes

References

External links
 Official blog 
 Satoru Noda on Twitter 
 

Living people
Manga artists from Hokkaido
Manga Taishō
Winner of Tezuka Osamu Cultural Prize (Grand Prize)
Year of birth missing (living people)